Heath Denman (born 17 January 1971) is a former professional tennis player from Australia.

Biography
Denman, who comes from Ipswich in Queensland, was given a wildcard into the 1991 Australian Open, which he exited with a first-round loss to Mats Wilander. When he returned to the main draw of the Australia Open in 1993 he made it to the second round by beating Jeremy Bates in four sets. In 1993 he also featured in the main draw of ATP Tour tournaments in Kuala Lumpur and Sydney. For most of 1994 and 1995 he took time away from tennis, but was then motivated to make a comeback and appeared at the 1996 Australian Open.

References

External links
 
 

1971 births
Living people
Australian male tennis players
Tennis people from Queensland
Sportspeople from Ipswich, Queensland
20th-century Australian people
21st-century Australian people